Stanley Lewis is the name of:

J. E. Stanley Lewis (1888–1970), mayor of Ottawa, 1936–1948
C. Stanley Lewis, artist, Guggenheim Fellow
Stanley Lewis (sculptor) (1930–2006), Montreal sculptor, 1930–2004
Stanley Cornwell Lewis (1905–2009), British portrait painter and illustrator
Stan Lewis (record label owner) (1927–2018), American record label owner and songwriter

See also
Stanton Lewis (disambiguation)